Charles J. Adams (February 17, 1917 – May 16, 2008) was a Vermont attorney whose career included an interim appointment as Vermont Attorney General.

Biography
Charles Jairus Adams was born in Randolph, Vermont on February 17, 1917, the son of Charles Bayley Adams and Jeanette (Metzger) Adams.  His father served as an Associate Justice of the Vermont Supreme Court from 1949 to 1961.  Adams was raised and educated in Waterbury, and graduated from Norwich University in 1939.

Adams joined the United States Army for World War II and served as a captain with the 3rd Armored Division during combat in the European Theater of Operations.  On July 5, 1942 he married Mary Ella Tobey of Belmont, Massachusetts; they were married in Leesville, Louisiana while Adams was stationed at Camp Beauregard prior to his unit's departure for Europe.

In 1951 Adams graduated from the Boston University School of Law and became an attorney, first in Montpelier and later in Waterbury.  A Republican in politics, he was active in local government including Waterbury village trustee and president, and member of the town of Waterbury's school board.  He was also involved in several civic and fraternal organizations, including the Masons and Shriners, the Norwich University Alumni Association and the Norwich University Cemetery Board of Trustees.

In December 1961, Governor F. Ray Keyser announced that he would appoint Adams as Vermont Attorney General to fill the vacancy left by the resignation of Thomas M. Debevoise.  Adams assumed the office on January 2, 1962, and served until the end of Debevoise's term in January 1963.  He did not run for a full term in 1962, and was succeeded by Charles E. Gibson, Jr, who had served as his deputy.

Adams continued practicing law, and later moved to South Burlington.  He died on May 16, 2008 at the Vermont Respite House in Williston.  He was survived by his daughters Mary Jean Sturgis and Carol Allen.

References

1917 births
2008 deaths
People from Randolph, Vermont
Vermont lawyers
Vermont Attorneys General
United States Army personnel of World War II
Norwich University alumni
Boston University School of Law alumni
Republican Party members of the Vermont House of Representatives
Burials in Vermont
United States Army officers
20th-century American politicians
20th-century American lawyers